USS Claiborne (AK-171) was an  commissioned by the U.S. Navy for service in World War II. She was responsible for delivering troops, goods and equipment to locations in the war zone.

Construction
Claiborne was launched 3 September 1944, by Froemming Brothers, Inc., Milwaukee, Wisconsin, under a Maritime Commission contract, MC hull 2144; sponsored by Miss L. Kapczynski; and commissioned 19 April 1945 at New Orleans, Louisiana.

Service history

World War II Pacific Theatre operations
Claiborne departed Gulfport, Mississippi, 20 May 1945 and arrived at Hollandia, New Guinea, 5 July. For the next 6 months she operated in the Philippines and New Guinea areas, carrying food, and supplies, and helping to redeploy troops among the various islands. Claiborne sailed from Manila 6 January 1946, for Yokosuka, Japan, anchoring there 13 January.

Post-war decommissioning

Claiborne was decommissioned and transferred to the War Shipping Administration at Tokyo 7 February 1946. The ship was operated by the War Department until placed in the Reserve Fleet berthing area at Olympia, Washington, on 5 May 1950. Ultimately, she was sold to the Marine Power & Equipment Company, on 6 January 1971, and was delivered to her purchaser at Olympia on 1 February 1971 for scrapping.

Notes 

Citations

Bibliography

External links

 

Alamosa-class cargo ships
Claiborne Parish, Louisiana
Claiborne County, Mississippi
Claiborne County, Tennessee
Ships built in Milwaukee
1944 ships
World War II auxiliary ships of the United States